Junglee Pictures is a film production and distribution company that was established by Vineet Jain of The Times Group in 2014. As of 2022, the company has produced nine Hindi films

Their first release came in 2015 with Zoya Akhtar's family drama Dil Dhadakne Do, and in the same year, they produced Meghna Gulzar's crime drama Talvar, which won two National Film Awards.

Junglee Pictures went on to collaborate with the actor Ayushmann Khurrana in three films, the romantic comedy Bareilly Ki Barfi (2017), the comedy-drama Badhaai Ho (2018) and campus medical comedy film, Doctor G (2022). Badhaai Ho (2018)  became the company's highest-grossing release. They also reunited with Gulzar in the Alia Bhatt-starring spy film Raazi (2018), which ranks among the highest-grossing female-led Hindi films.

History
Junglee Pictures was founded in February 2014 by Vineet Jain of The Times Group. The company's first film release came the following year with Dil Dhadakne Do, a family drama directed by Zoya Akhtar, which featured an ensemble cast headlined by Anil Kapoor, Shefali Shah, Priyanka Chopra, Ranveer Singh, Anushka Sharma and Farhan Akhtar. A significant portion of the film was photographed in the Pullmantur Cruises ship MS Sovereign. The film received positive reviews for its performances and direction, but received criticism for its running time and climax. It earned 145 crores against a budget of 83 crores.

The company's second film release came in the same year with Bangistan (2015), a comedy directed by Karan Anshuman, and starring Riteish Deshmukh and Pulkit Samrat. Keen to "tell stories that were inspired by real incidents", Junglee Pictures next produced Talvar, a partly fictional retelling of the 2008 Noida double murder case. Starring Irrfan Khan, Konkona Sen Sharma, Neeraj Kabi and Sohum Shah, the film was directed by Meghna Gulzar and penned by Vishal Bhardwaj. Bhardwaj has said that his screenplay was influenced by the Rashomon effect (in which the same event is given different interpretations by the individuals involved). Rajeev Masand termed the film a "gripping, then baffling, and ultimately disturbing account" of the murder, "deliberately unsentimental and melodrama-free". Joe Leydon of Variety called the film's screenplay "solidly constructed" and its narrative "satisfyingly brisk". Talvar won two awards each at the National Film Awards and the Filmfare Award ceremonies, including the Best Adapted Screenplay Award for Bhardwaj at the former.

In 2017, the company produced the romantic comedy Bareilly Ki Barfi, directed by Ashwiny Iyer Tiwari and written by Nitesh Tiwari and Shreyas Jain. It starred Ayushmann Khurrana, Kriti Sanon and Rajkummar Rao and tells the story of a love triangle involving a headstrong young woman living in Bareilly, Uttar Pradesh. Rohit Vats of Hindustan Times praised the film for effectively capturing "the flavour of small-town India". It emerged as a sleeper hit. At the 63rd Filmfare Awards, the film won Best Director for Tiwari and Best Supporting Actor for Rao.

Junglee Pictures had two film releases in 2018. The spy film Raazi marked their second collaboration with Meghna Gulzar. Starring Alia Bhatt and Vicky Kaushal, the film is an adaptation of Harinder Sikka's novel Calling Sehmat, which was inspired by real events of a Kashmiri spy who married a Pakistani policeman prior to the Indo-Pakistani War of 1971. The film emerged as one of the highest-grossing Hindi films featuring a female protagonist. The company's second film release that year came with Badhaai Ho, starring Ayushmann Khurrana, Neena Gupta, Gajraj Rao, and Sanya Malhotra, which is about a middle-aged couple who get pregnant much to the disappointment of their adult son. Both Raazi and Badhaai Ho gained critical acclaim and rank among the highest-grossing Hindi films of 2018. The latter earned over 221 crores to emerge as the company's biggest commercial success. Both films also won several awards at the 64th Filmfare Awards, with Raazi winning a leading five, including Best Film and Best Director for Gulzar.

The company's sole film release of 2019 came with Chuck Russell's Junglee, an adventure film starring Vidyut Jammwal, which performed poorly at the box office. Future projects of the company include Vishal Bhardwaj's crime film based on the murder of Pradyuman Thakur. Junglee Pictures will also produce an as-yet untitled web series adapted from Arnab Ray's novel The Mahabharata Murders.

In March 2020, Junglee Pictures announced spiritual sequel of Badhaai Ho, titled Badhaai Do starring Rajkummar Rao and Bhumi Pednekar. On 11 February 2022, Badhaai Do released in theatres to critical acclaim. 

Their ninth film, Doctor G is slated for release on 14 October 2022. It is a campus medical comedy film directed by Anubhuti Kashyap (in her directorial debut). It stars Ayushmann Khurrana (third collaboration with actor) and Rakul Preet Singh

Filmography

References

Hindi cinema
Film production companies based in Mumbai
Entertainment companies established in 2015
Mass media companies established in 2015
Producers who won the Best Popular Film Providing Wholesome Entertainment National Film Award